Albatross is a lightweight, soft material with a napped and  slightly creped surface. It has the worsted appearance.

Name 
The fabric is called "Albatross" because it has a similar texture to Albatross's breast.

Weave 
Albatross is made of wool or blends, and it may be in plain or twill, both with a loose weave.

Use 
Albatross is used in making soft clothes such as clothes for infants and negligees.

References 

Woven fabrics